Piz Porchabella is a mountain of the Albula Alps, overlooking the Porchabella Glacier, north-east of Piz Kesch in the canton of Graubünden.

References

External links
 Piz Porchabella on Hikr

Mountains of the Alps
Mountains of Graubünden
Mountains of Switzerland